Émilie-Louise Delabigne, known as countess Valtesse de La Bigne (1848, in Paris – 29 July 1910, in Ville-d'Avray) was a French courtesan and demi-mondaine.

Life

Youth and entry into prostitution
One of six siblings, Émilie-Louise was the daughter of a violent alcoholic father and Émilie Delabigne, a laundry maid from Normandy who was also involved in sex work. She worked in a Paris sweet shop at age 10 and a dress shop at 13, when she was raped in the street by an older man. She modelled for the painter Corot, whose studio was in the district where she lived. At a young age she began work as a prostitute, lorette (respectable mistress), between the lower-class streetwalker or grisette and upper-class courtesan. Nevertheless, this was still clandestine prostitution, often in doorways, and came with the risk of police arrest or having one's head shaved as punishment or humiliation.

Quickly moving onto rich clients, she trained at the Bal Mabille on Sundays and worked in a women's underwear shop on the Champ-de-Mars, frequented by high-ranking officers, enabling her to dream of social climbing. There she met and fell in love with a 20-year-old man, Richard Fossey, with whom she had two children, (Julia Pâquerette Fossey, 3 March 1868, and Valérie Fossey, ca.1869) though Fossey left her to go to Algeria two years later without marrying her as he had promised.

de La Bigne entrusted her two children to her mother, who later on took them to live in the countryside. Following the death of her younger daughter while in her mother's care, de La Bigne won a public court case against her mother, who was allowing history to repeat itself as her granddaughter became increasingly drawn into the prostitution of France's demimonde. After winning custody of her one remaining daughter — with whom she had become pregnant at age 19 — de La Bigne had her placed into a Catholic boarding school. Later, bitter at her loss of regular income in lieu of providing childcare, her mother assaulted de La Bigne's housekeeper Camille Meldola, a childhood friend, who also took her to court, but her case was thrown out.

Valtesse's relationship with her sister Emilie Delabigne Tremblay was similarly confrontational. Emilie worked as a madam with a brothel in the Rue Blanche and called herself "Marquesse". In the early 1880s, conflict came between Valtesse, her sister Emilie, and her mother when it appeared her mother and sister were attempting to draw her daughter Julia-Pâquerette into sex work.

Émilie-Louise Delabigne took the pseudonym "Valtesse" due to its similarity to "Votre Altesse" (your highness) — she later advised Anne-Marie Chassaigne to take a pseudonym as well. She also resolved never to marry but to gain money and social position by other means. She profited from the "brésiliens", foreign clients visiting Paris, and aspired to join the "archidrôlesses", a group of courtesans.

Jacques Offenbach brought Valtesse to public attention with a small role at the Bouffes-Parisiens and proposed that she act in his productions. Her debut was as Hebe in Orphée aux Enfers – one critic judged that she was "as red and timid as a virgin by Titian." She went on to act in minor parts in Le Fifre enchanté, as Saturnin in La Chanson de Fortunio, Berthe in La Diva, a page in La Princesse de Trébizonde. Her first major role was Mistress Johnson in La Romance de la Rose, in which she sang.

"Courtisane du Tout-Paris" 

Valtesse was not as successful in her acting career as Offenbach's former protégé, Hortense Schneider. Rather, she became the composer's mistress and thus gained access to fashionable restaurants such as Bignon (the former 'Café Foy') and the Café Tortoni, where she met Zola, Flaubert, and Maupassant. Even the starvation of the siege of Paris did not dampen her aspirations – in the tumult of the period, she refashioned herself again into pseudo-aristocracy by altering her last name, Delabigne, to the Normandy-noble "de la Bigne", as well as adopting the title "Comtesse". Known among the Tout-Paris (elite, Jet set) for his scathing humour, the journalist and writer Aurélien Scholl wrote, "During the siege of Paris, all the women ate dog. It was thought that this nourishment taught them the principles of fidelity. Not at all! They demanded necklaces!"

At the end of the war, Valtesse quickly launched herself as a high-class courtesan, leaving Offenbach and shifting her attentions to Prince Lubomirski, who installed her in an apartment in rue Saint-Georges. She wrecked it, left him, and had a succession of other rich lovers, such as Prince de Sagan, whom she also bankrupted by having him build her a hôtel particulier (grand town house) designed by Jules Février between 1873 and 1876 at 98, Boulevard Malesherbes, at the corner of rue de la Terrasse (destroyed and replaced by a residential block in 1904).

Self-nicknamed "Rayon d'or" or "golden ray", she immersed herself in art and literature. She bought a carriage to travel around Paris, and bought a sumptuous house at Ville-d'Avray, which she decorated with paintings commissioned from Édouard Detaille showing fictional members of her invented "la Bigne family." In 1876 she published an autobiographical novel entitled Isola, signed "Ego" (her motto) – it was not a major success. It did, however, generate quite a buzz, according to Catherine Hewitt: "Thanks to the promotional skills of her contacts in the press, the book generated a wave of interest before it was even released. [...] Valtesse's diverse marketing strategies reaped immediate benefits; curious Parisians hurried out to purchase a copy of Isola. It was a fiction, but all those who knew Valtesse could testify to its autobiographical quality." At least two editions can be found at the Bibliothèque Nationale de France, with one digital copy available to all. "Ego" had looked to the memoirs of Céleste de Chabrillan (published under the moniker Mogador) for inspiration: "The volume gave the courtesan a chance to respond to her public's perception of her. With her memoirs, Mogador had seized control. Valtesse sensed an irresistible opportunity.  Not only would writing a book earn respect and provide an outlet for her creativity, it was a chance to shape her public image. She could dispel the myths she disliked and encourage those she approved." Just as de Chabrillan's memoirs had influenced Valtesse's Isola, "Ego's" autobiographical fiction would in turn inspire another courtesan's work: "Liane de Pougy, roused in turn by her mentor's tome Isola, would also contribute to the courtesan subgenre in four novels she wrote during the Belle Époque. Born Anne-Marie Chassaigne, she renamed herself Liane de Pougy and earned notoriety  as a dancer and courtesan who engaged in several lesbian affairs (including one with de la Bigne) in fin de siècle France."

The novelist Émile Zola mined the lives of Paris's elite courtesans for his novel's inspiration. He interviewed Ludovic Halévy, Offenbach's librettist, for details of Valtesse's life. At the request of Léon Hennique, she showed Émile Zola round her hôtel particulier at 98, Boulevard Malesherbes. Her bedchamber and bed were the inspiration for those in his novel Nana: "A bed such as has never existed, a throne, an altar where Paris came to admire her sovereign nudity [...]. Along its sides, a band of cupids among flowers who look on and smile, watching the pleasures in shadows of the curtains." When she read the novel, Valtesse was indignant to find such a description of her decor – "some traces of tender foolishness and gaudy splendour" — and called the character of Nana (for which she was the inspiration) "a vulgar whore, stupid, rude!" Alexandre Dumas fils asked to enter her bedroom, but she coldly replied, "Dear sir, it's not within your means!"

Artists' friend 

Henri Gervex used her as the model for the courtesan in Civil Marriage, which decorated the marriage room in the mairie of Paris's 19th arrondissement. She also inspired the heroine of La Nichina, the novel by Hugues Rebell, and the character Altesse in her friend and lover Liane de Pougy's novel Idylle saphique. Valtesse likely also served as the model for Henri Gervex's La Toilette (1878). 

Valtesse was a friend and sometime lover of Édouard Manet, Henri Gervex, Édouard Detaille, Gustave Courbet, Eugène Boudin and Alphonse de Neuville, earning her the nicknames "l'Union des Peintres" or "Altesse de la Guigne". She posed for Manet, Gervex and Forain and Detaille lived near her on boulevard Malesherbes. She also talked with writers like Octave Mirbeau, Arsène Houssaye, Pierre Louÿs, Théophile Gautier and Edmond de Goncourt, inspiring his Chérie.

A neighbour of Léon Gambetta in Ville-d'Avray, she asked to meet him. Although a Bonapartist, she argued with him that France should keep Tonkin – she knew its geopolitics via a correspondence with a former lover Alexandre de Kergaradec, French consul in Hanoï, who had also sent her several gifts including a gigantic pagoda. On 9 June 1885 France recognised the French protectorate over Annam and Tonkin.

She amassed a vast art collection, later sold by auction between 2 and 7 June 1902 at the hôtel Drouot. She left her vast bronze bed (created in 1877 by Édouard Lièvre) to the Musée des Arts Décoratifs, Paris, where it is still on display.

She drove a car, built the villa of Les Aigles in Monte-Carlo, sold her hôtel particulier on boulevard Malesherbes, whereupon she mainly lived in Ville-d'Avray, where she trained young women to become courtesans. When she was 62, one of her veins burst and she died shortly afterwards. She wrote her own death announcement, stating: "One must love a little or a lot, following nature, but quickly, during an instant, as one loves a birdsong which speaks to one's soul and which one forgets with its last note, as one loves the crimson hues of the sun at the moment when it disappears below the horizon". She was buried in the town cemetery with two men: Commander Louis Marius Auriac and an unknown "E. Luna".

Her daughter, Julia Pâquerette, went on to marry Paul Jules August Godard and had three children: Paul, Margot, and Andrée. Liane de Pougy served as Margot's godmother.  Like her grandmother, Andrée got her start in the theater. She started acting in New York in the early 1920s, going by the name Andrée Lafayette.

Portraits
 1879 : by Édouard Manet, pastel, 55.2 x 35.6 cm, Metropolitan Museum of Art, New York City
 1889 : by Henri Gervex, oil on canvas, musée d'Orsay, Paris

References

Bibliography
 Catherine Hewitt, The Mistress of Paris: The 19th-Century Courtesan Who Built an Empire on a Secret, London, Icon Books, 2015, 320 pages, .
 Yolaine de La Bigne, Valtesse de La Bigne ou le pouvoir de la volupté, Paris, Librairie académique Perrin, 1999, 244 pages, .

External links
 Valtesse de la Bigne – Bibliothèque nationale de France

1848 births
1910 deaths
Socialites from Paris
Courtesans from Paris
French prostitutes
French artists' models